Grevillea tenuiflora, commonly known as amber grevillea,<ref name=FB>{{FloraBase|name=Grevillea tenuiloba|id=2103}}</ref> is a species of flowering plant in the family Proteaceae and is endemic to the south-west of Western Australia. It is a low, spreading shrub with pinnatipartite leaves with 5 to 11 linear to cylindrical lobes, and clusters of orange flowers often borne close to the ground.

The leaf rachis is strongly turned down, and the edges of the leaves are rolled under, enclosing most of the lower surface.

TaxonomyGrevillea tenuiflora was first formally described in 1933 by Charles Gardner in the Journal of the Royal Society of Western Australia from specimens collected in 1932 near Dandaragan by William Blackall. The specific epithet (tenuiloba) is derived from the Latin word tenuis, meaning narrow and the word lobus meaning lobe in reference to the shape of the leaf lobes.

Distribution and habitat
Amber grevillea grows in Melaleuca shrubland between Wongan Hills and Jibberding near Wubin in the Avon Wheatbelt bioregion of south-western Western Australia.

Conservation statusGrevillea tenuiloba'' is listed as "Priority Three" by the Government of Western Australia Department of Biodiversity, Conservation and Attractions, meaning that it is poorly known and known from only a few locations but is not under imminent threat.

Use in horticulture
This grevillea can be grown from scarified seed or from firm cuttings of the current season's growth. It is best suited to a dry summer climate, unless grafted on to a hardy rootstock.

See also
 List of Grevillea species

References

tenuiloba
Proteales of Australia
Eudicots of Western Australia
Taxa named by Charles Gardner
Plants described in 1934